Marc Rogers is a Canadian acoustic and electric bassist.

Career
Rogers studied at the University of North Texas College of Music, where he was a member of the One O'Clock Lab Band directed by Neil Slater.

He is a member of the band The Philosopher Kings.  Rogers tours with and is a member of Michael Kaeshammer's band. He has recorded and written music for film and TV including Zoe Busiek: Wild Card, the L Word, Lie With Me and Saint Ralph.

In 1999, Rogers was the bassist for the band Laszlo which featured Norah Jones as the lead singer.
  
In 2006 he was in a jazz ensemble with Robi Botos, Phil Dwyer, and Terri Lyne Carrington.  They were nominated for a Juno Award in the category Contemporary Jazz Album of the Year for the recording One Take – Volume II.

Rogers is a contributing columnist for Canadian Musician Magazine.

Personal life
Rogers is married to singer/songwriter Karen Kosowski.

Selected discography
Solo
 Marc Rogers – Lunasa (2003)

With Jarvis Church
 Jarvis Church & The Soul Station – Vol. 1 (2012)

With Shawn Hook
Cosmonaut and the Girl (2012)

With Michael Kaeshammer
KaeshammerLive! (2012)
KAESHAMMER (2011)
Lovelight (2009)

With Emma-Lee
Backseat Heroine (2012)

With Sarah Harmer
Oh Little Fire (2010)

With Nelly Furtado
Mi Plan (2009)

With Mark McLean
Playground (2010)

With Anjulie
Anjulie (2009)

With Kelly Jefferson Quartet
Next Exit (2010)
Spark (2005)

With Stereos
Throw Ya Hands Up (Single)(2009)
Summer Girl (Single)(2009)

With Justin Hines
Chasing Silver (2009)

With Kreesha Turner
Passion (2008)

With Serena Ryder
Calling To Say (Single)(2007)

With The Philosopher Kings
Castles (2006)

With Theo Tams
Sing (Single)(2008)

With Fefe Dobson
Joy (2010)

With K'naan
The Dusty Foot Philosopher (2005)

With Peter Katz
More Nights (2007)

With Amanda Stott
Chasing the Sky (2005)

With Sophie Milman
Sophie Milman (2004)

With Emilie-Claire Barlow
Like a Lover (2005)

With Layah Jane
Grievance and Gratitude (2005)

With Emma Roberts
Grievance and Gratitude (2005)

With Matt Dusk
Peace on Earth (2004)

With The Good Lovelies
Let The Rain Fall (2005)

With Emblem3
Nothing to Lose (2005)

With Kate Ceberano
Kensal Road (2013)

With Barbra Lica
That's What I Do (2012)

References

Canadian rhythm and blues musicians
Living people
Year of birth missing (living people)
Place of birth missing (living people)
20th-century Canadian bass guitarists
21st-century Canadian bass guitarists